Colina (which means "hill" in Spanish and Portuguese) may refer to:

Places
Colina, São Paulo, Brazil
Colina, Chile
Colina (Madrid), a ward in Madrid, Spain
Colina, a village in Murighiol Commune, Tulcea County, Romania

People
Alejandro Colina (1901–1976), Venezuelan sculptor
Alvin Colina (born 1981), Venezuelan baseball player
Josip Colina (born 1980), Bosnian-Swiss footballer
Braulio Carrillo Colina (1800–1845), Costa Rican head of state in the 19th century
Mirco Colina (born 1990), Curaçaoan footballer
Simón Colina (born 1995), Spanish footballer

Other uses 
Colina (gastropod), a genus of sea snails
Grupo Colina, Peruvian paramilitary death squad
Comando de Libertação Nacional (Colina,), defunct Brazilian leftist group

See also 
 Collina (disambiguation)